Thornton Le Fen is a small civil parish in the East Lindsey district of Lincolnshire, England.

Thornton Le Fen lies in Wildmore Fen, created in 1812 after the fen was drained in 1802. It is mostly farmland with a population of 345, and contains the hamlets of Bunkers Hill and Gipsey Bridge. The  Census of 2011 showed a reduced population of 322.

Gipsey Bridge School was built in 1859 and was taken over by the Wildmore Fen United District School Board in 1879, when it was renamed the Gipsey Bridge Board School, until the Board was abolished in 1903. Following this it was known as Thornton Le Fen Council School, Thornton Le Fen County School, and Gipsey Bridge County Primary School, before it took its present name, Gipsey Bridge Primary School, in 1999.

References

External links

Villages in Lincolnshire
Civil parishes in Lincolnshire
East Lindsey District